This is a list of earthquakes in Malaysia:

Earthquakes

References 

Sources

 
Malaysia
Earthquakes
Earthquakes